Krajewski (feminine: Krajewska; plural: Krajewscy) is a Polish-language surname. It is derived from place names such as Krajewo and the noun "kraj". It appears in various forms in other languages.

People 
 Adam Krajewski (1929–2000), Polish fencer
 Aleksander Albert Krajewski (1818–1903), Polish publicist and translator
 Anna Żemła-Krajewska (born 1979), Polish judoka
 Henry B. Krajewski (1912–1966), American politician
 Joan L. Krajewski (1934–2013), American politician
 Julia Krajewski (born 1988), German equestrian
 Konrad Krajewski (born 1963), Polish clergyman, Vatican official
 Krzysztof Krajewski (born 1963), Polish diplomat
 Marek Krajewski (born 1966), Polish crime writer and linguist
 Michał Dymitr Krajewski (1746–1817), Polish writer and educational activist
 Mirosław Krajewski (born 1946), Polish politician
 Mirosława Krajewska (born 1940), Polish actress
 Monika Krajewska, Polish artist
 Przemysław Krajewski (born 1987), Polish handball player
 Rick Krajewski (born 1991), American politician
 Seweryn Krajewski (born 1947), Polish singer and songwriter
 Stanisław Krajewski (born 1950), Polish philosopher
 Teodora Krajewska (1854–1935), Polish physician
 Tom Krajewski (born 1977), American television writer and podcaster

See also

References

Polish-language surnames